Zavana is a genus of moths in the subfamily Lymantriinae erected by Paul Griveaud in 1976. They are found on Madagascar.

Species
Some species of this genus are:
Zavana acroleuca (Hering, 1926) – type species
Zavana iodnephes (Collenette, 1936)

References

Lymantriinae